Christian Bernier (born November 20, 1981 in Sudbury, Ontario) is a male volleyball player from Canada, who competed for the Men's National Team. He was a member of the national squad who ended up in seventh place at the 2007 Pan American Games in Rio de Janeiro, Brazil.

References
Canada Olympic Committee

1981 births
Living people
Canadian expatriate sportspeople in Austria
Canadian men's volleyball players
Franco-Ontarian people
Sportspeople from Greater Sudbury
Université de Montréal alumni
Volleyball people from Ontario
Volleyball players at the 2007 Pan American Games
Pan American Games competitors for Canada